Amélie is the soundtrack to the 2001 French film Amélie.

Director Jean-Pierre Jeunet was introduced to the accordion- and piano-driven music of Yann Tiersen by his production assistant. Greatly impressed, he immediately bought Tiersen's entire catalogue and eventually commissioned him to compose pieces for the film. The soundtrack features both compositions from Tiersen's first three albums, as well as new items, variants of which can be found on his fourth album, L'Absente, which he was writing at the same time.

Besides the accordion and piano, the music features parts played with harpsichord, banjo, bass guitar, vibraphone, and even a bicycle wheel at the end of "La Dispute" (which plays over the opening titles in the motion picture).

Before discovering Tiersen, Jeunet wanted composer Michael Nyman to score the film.

"Les Jours Tristes" was co-written with Neil Hannon of The Divine Comedy. The track later received English lyrics, and was released by The Divine Comedy as a b-side to the Regeneration single, "Perfect Lovesong." The English-language version also appeared on Tiersen's L'Absente.

Track listing

Personnel

Musicians
 Yann Tiersen – piano, toy piano, carillon, banjo, mandolin, guitar, harpsichord, vibraphone, accordion, bass, melodica
 Ensemble Orchestral Synaxis – orchestra on "Les Jours tristes" and "À quai"
 Christine Ott – ondes Martenot on "À quai"
 Christian Quermalet – drums on "Les Jours tristes"

Production
 Uwe Teichert – mastering
 Fabrice Laureau – mixing
 Marc Bruckert – artwork
 Laurent Lufroy – film poster

Awards and nominations
The list is made with information from IMDb.

Awards
 2001 — World Soundtrack Award for Best Original Score of the Year
 2002 — César Award for Best Music Written for a Film

Nominations
 2001 — BAFTA Award for Best Film Music
 2001 — World Soundtrack Award for Soundtrack Composer of the Year
 2001 — Phoenix Film Critics Society Award for Best Original Soundtrack of the Year

Charts

Weekly charts

Year-end charts

Certifications and sales

Covers

The band New Found Glory covered "J'y suis jamais allé" on their second covers album From the Screen to Your Stereo Part II.
The song was also used by Expression Crew in their dance act Marionette.

Pianist, composer Dmytro Morykit arranged and plays a cover version of "Comptine d'un autre été : L'après-midi".

References

Comedy film soundtracks
Yann Tiersen albums
2001 soundtrack albums
Virgin Records soundtracks
French-language soundtracks